Moorkoth Kumaran (1874–1941) was a social reformer, a teacher and a writer in Malayalam. He came from a Thiyya family of Telicherry. He was a disciple of Narayana Guru and wrote the first biography of Guru. He also published some of the earliest short stories and novels in Malayalam.

Biography
Moorkoth Kumaran was born on May 23, 1874 into the Moorkoth family of North Malabar. His father was Moorkoth Ramunni, and his mother was Parappurathu Kunchirutha. His mother died when he was aged six and his father when he was eight. Kumaran grew up under the care of his father's sister. Kumaran started his education by joining Basel Mission Parsi High School, Telicherry, in 1884 and passed FA degree from Telicherry Brennen College. He joined Madras Christian College for a BA degree but could not complete the degree. He married his relative Yashoda and was sent by his father-in-law for training at Teachers' College, Saidapet. After completing his training, Kumaran became a teacher at St. Joseph's European Boy's High School in Calicut in 1897. He was the headmaster there from 1898 to 1900. He then became a teacher at St. Joseph's Convent, and it was during this time that Indian women in Malabar started education in English schools. Grace Chandran, who was the first Indian woman in Malabar to pass Matriculation, was his student. Kumaran worked as the senior Malayalam pandit at St. Aloysius College (1907–1912), headmaster at Nettur Basel Mission Middle School (1913–1924) and first assistant at Telicherry St Joseph's School (1924–1930) from where he retired in 1930. 

Kumaran was instrumental in spreading the ideas of Sri Narayana Guru in Malabar. It was Kumaran who initiated placing the statue of Guru at Jagannath Temple in Telicherry in 1927. It was the first statue of Narayana Guru in Kerala when he was alive. Kumaran was also instrumental in the efforts to admit the Pulayas and other lower castes into the Jagannath Temple. He was the second general secretary of SNDP Yogam.

Kumaran was active in social and literary circles post-retirement. He wrote his last story titled "Aliyante Saree" in Brennen College magazine. He died on June 25, 1941. Moorkoth Kunhappa, who was a bureaucrat and prominent journalist, Moorkoth Ramunni, who was a fighter pilot, and Moorkoth Sreenivasan, who was a teacher in Pondicherry, are his sons.

Writing
Moorkoth Kumaran, Vengayil Kunhiraman Nayanar, Oduvil Kunhikrishna Menon, C. S. Gopala Panicker, Ambadi Narayana Poduval and Chenkulath Cheriya Kunhirama Menon (M. R. K. C.) are regarded as the pioneers of the short story in Malayalam literature. In 1891, Kumaran wrote his first story Kalikala Vaibhavam when he was still a student. The story was returned by two editors until finally accepted by Kandathil Varghese Mappillai who published it in Malayala Manorama on February 22, 1896. Then the next story called Anyatha Chinthitham Karyam Daivamanyathra Chinthayel was published in Bhashaposhini, also by Varghese Mappillai. Vengayil Kunhiraman Nayanar's "Vasanavikriti" is recognised as the first short story in Malayalam, but Kumaran's "Kalikala Vaibhavam" is sometimes acknowledged as the first well-shaped short story in Malayalam. The initial eleven years from 1891 saw eleven short stories published in Malayalam, authored by Vengayil Kunhiraman Nayanar, Moorkoth Kumaran, C. S. Gopala Panicker and Oduvil Kunhikrishna Menon. Among the eleven stories, four were by Kumaran. Writer Moorkoth Kunhappa has noted that Kumaran's short stories follow the principle of 'singleness of effect' which was lacking in most of the early short stories in Malayalam.

Kumaran was also one of the early novelists who wrote seven novels namely Lokapavadam, Kanakam Moolam, Jahaneera, Rajaputhra Viwaham, Ambu Nair, Vasumathi and Vellikkai. He also penned the prose collections Kakan, Gadyaprabandham, Gadyamanjari and Asan Vimarsanathinte Aadya Rasmikal. After writing Kakan (Crow), which was based on an article by ornithologist Douglas Dewar, Kumaran wrote extensively on science. He wrote articles on insects, flies, mosquitoes, beetles, ants, termites, cockroaches and wild lice. He also translated the book Wonders of Physical Science by Edmund Edward Fournier d'Albe into Malayalam under the title Prakriti Shastrathile Albuthangal.

After Kumaran prepared the biography of Sri Narayana Guru in two volumes (1930), he also wrote an interpretation of Guru's Darsanamala. He wrote the story "Vasumathi" which depicts the culture and history of the Thiyya community in Malabar. Kumaran also wrote the biographies of O. Chandu Menon and Vengayil Kunhiraman Nayanar and has also written biographical essays on Kandathil Varghese Mappillai, Kerala Varma Valiya Koil Thampuran, A. R. Raja Raja Varma and Kumaran Asan.

Moorkoth Kumaran edited several literary journals in Malayalam. He entered the newspaper industry as the editor of Kerala Sanchari. Kumaran Asan's Veena Poovu was first published in Mithavadi when Kumaran was the editor. Subsequently, Kumaran, edited Kerala Chintamani, Samudaya Deepika, Gajakesari, Satyavadi, Atmaposhini, Dharmam, Kathorakuthaaram and Deepika. He wrote many articles in prominent newspapers of the time under the pen names of Gajakesari, Patanjali, Vajrasuchi and Pouran.

Bibliography
The following list includes most of the published works of Moorkoth Kumaran:

Novels

Short story collections

Short stories

Children's literature

Criticism / Biography

Translations

Others

References

Narayana Guru
Malayali people
1874 births
1941 deaths
19th-century Indian short story writers
20th-century Indian short story writers
Indian schoolteachers
Educators from Kerala
Writers from Kerala